Acer komarovii, the Korean butterfly maple, is a species of flowering plant in the genus Acer, native to Manchuria, the Korean peninsula, and Primorsky Krai in Russia. It can be distinguished from other members of the Acer tschonoskii species complex by having racemes with 6 to 8 flowers, and samara wings that average 12m long (ranging between 10 and 17mm), and 7mm wide (ranging between 6 and 9mm).

References

komarovii
Plants described in 1949